WBYE (1370 AM) was an American radio station formerly licensed to the community of Calera, Alabama, and serving the greater Birmingham, Alabama, area. The station was owned by Progressive United Communications, Inc. It aired a Gospel music format. The station was assigned the WBYE call letters by the Federal Communications Commission.

History
In June 1983, Shelby County Advertising Corporation reached an agreement to sell WBYE to B.M. Murchison.  The deal was approved by the FCC on August 18, 1983, and the transaction was consummated on December 12, 1983.

In January 1986, B.M, Murchison reached an agreement to sell WBYE to Thomas Ellsworth Leighton.  The deal was approved by the FCC on February 24, 1986, and the transaction was consummated on March 20, 1986.

In March 1989, Laura Lou Roberts Leighton, executrix of the estate of Thomas Ellsworth Leighton, reached an agreement to sell this radio station to WBYE Broadcasting Company, Inc.  The deal was approved by the FCC on March 2, 1989, and the transaction was consummated on April 10, 1989.

In November 1999, WBYE Broadcasting Company, Inc., reached an agreement to sell WBYE to Progressive United Communications, Inc.  The deal was approved by the FCC on February 4, 2000, and the transaction was consummated on April 28, 2000.

On April 6, 2012, the station's license was cancelled and its callsign deleted from the FCC's database.

References

External links
Query the FCC's AM station database for WBYE

Defunct religious radio stations in the United States
BYE
Radio stations established in 1958
Radio stations disestablished in 2012
Defunct radio stations in the United States
BYE
1958 establishments in Alabama
2012 disestablishments in Alabama
BYE